Crying Song is an album by jazz flautist Hubert Laws released on the CTI label featuring performances of popular music (including songs by Pink Floyd, The Beatles, The Monkees and The Bee Gees) and by Laws recorded in Memphis with Elvis Presley's rhythm section and at Rudy Van Gelder's studio.

Reception
The Allmusic review awarded the album 3 stars.

Track listing
 "La Jean" (Johnny Christopher) – 2:33
 "Love Is Blue/Sing a Rainbow" (André Popp/Arthur Hamilton) – 3:25
 "Crying Song" (Roger Waters) – 4:56
 "Listen to the Band" (Michael Nesmith) – 3:24
 "I've Gotta Get a Message to You" (Barry Gibb, Robin Gibb, Maurice Gibb) – 3:12
 "Feelin' Alright" (Dave Mason) – 2:34
 "Cymbaline" (Waters) – 3:55
 "How Long Will It Be?" (Hubert Laws) – 6:11
 "Let It Be" (John Lennon, Paul McCartney) – 3:32

Personnel
Hubert Laws – flute
Bobby Wood – piano (tracks 1, 2, 4–6 & 9) 
Bobby Emmons – organ (tracks 1, 2, 4–6 & 9) 
Bob James – electric piano, organ (tracks 3, 7 & 8)
George Benson (tracks 3, 7 & 8), Reggie Young (tracks 1, 2, 4–6 & 9) – guitar  
Mike Leech – electric bass (tracks 1, 2, 4–6 & 9) 
Ron Carter – bass (tracks 3, 7 & 8)
Gene Chrisman (tracks 1, 2, 4–6 & 9), Billy Cobham (track 3), Grady Tate (tracks 7 & 8) – drums 
Ernie Royal, Marvin Stamm – trumpet, flugelhorn (tracks 1, 2, 4–6 & 9) 
Garnett Brown, Tony Studd – trombone (tracks 1, 2, 4–6 & 9) 
Art Clarke, Seldon Powell – saxophone (tracks 1, 2, 4–6 & 9) 
Ed Shaughnessy – tabla, sand blocks (track 6)
Lewis Eley, Paul Gershman, George Ockner, Gene Orloff, Raoul Pollikoff, Matthew Raimondi, Sylvan Shulman, Avram Weiss – violin (tracks 1 & 2)
Charles McCracken, George Ricci – cello (tracks 1 & 2)
Bob James, Glen Spreen, Mike Leech – arranger

References

1969 albums
CTI Records albums
Hubert Laws albums
Albums produced by Creed Taylor
Albums recorded at Van Gelder Studio